Miralcamp is a village in the province of Lleida and autonomous community of Catalonia, Spain.

Climate
The climate is continental, or more detail mediterranean strong continental influence, and on which their situation in a depression and the contact with the climate of the Pyrenees have an important influence. It is a dry and arid climate with average temperatures of 14–16° and oscillations ranging between 38 °C in summer and 0° in winter.
Rainfall is low and erratic and banks are common fog by its location in a valley basin Segre, which are more common in autumn and winter.

References

External links
 Government data pages 

Municipalities in Pla d'Urgell